Alix or Aline FitzRoy (d. before 1141) was the illegitimate daughter of King Henry I of England by one of his many mistresses. She married Matthieu I of Montmorency and had the following issue:
Henry, died young before 1160
Bouchard V de Montmorency, (d. 1189 in Jerusalem), who married in 1173 Laurette of Hainaut (d. 9 August 1181), daughter of Count Baldwin IV of Hainaut. They had a son Matthieu II de Montmorency, nicknamed the Great.
Theobald de Montmorency, seigneur de Marly, he went on crusade in 1173. He died as a Cistercian monk sometime after 1189.
Herve de Montmorency, abbot of Saint-Martin de Montmorency, then deacon of the Church and dean of Paris before his death in 1192.
Matthieu de Montmorency (d. Constantinople 1204), he inherited the lordship from his brother Theobald.

Alix died before 1141. Her husband, Matthieu married Adelaide of Maurienne, the widow of Louis VI of France.

References

Sources

Illegitimate children of Henry I of England
12th-century English people
12th-century English women
12th-century deaths
Year of birth unknown
Daughters of kings